Visa requirements for Croatian citizens are administrative entry restrictions by the authorities of other states placed on citizens of Croatia. As of January 9, 2023, Croatian citizens had visa-free, eTA or visa on arrival access to 175 countries and territories, ranking the Croatian passport 18th in the world, according to the Henley Passport Index.

Visa requirements map

Visa requirements

Dependent, disputed or unrecognized territories

Disputed or unrecognized territories

Dependent and autonomous territories

Non-ordinary passports
Holders of various categories of official Croatian passports have additional visa-free access to the following countries:
 : diplomatic
 : diplomatic or service passports
 : diplomatic or service passports
 : diplomatic, official or service passports
 : diplomatic, official or service passports
 : diplomatic or official passports
 : diplomatic or service passports
 : diplomatic or service passports
 : diplomatic or service passports
 : diplomatic and service passports
 : diplomatic, official or service passports
 : (diplomatic or service passports)

Holders of diplomatic or service passports of any country have visa-free access to Cape Verde, Ethiopia, Mali and Zimbabwe.

Right to consular protection in non-EU countries

When in a non-EU country where there is no Croatian embassy, Croatian citizens as EU citizens have the right to get consular protection from the embassy of any other EU country present in that country.

See also List of diplomatic missions of Croatia.

Non-visa restrictions

See also

Visa requirements for European Union citizens
Croatian passport
List of passports
Foreign relations of Croatia
Croatian identity card
Visa policy of the Schengen Area

References and Notes
References

Notes

External links

Visa requirements overview

Croatia
Foreign relations of Croatia